The Principality of Volhynia was a western Kievan Rus' principality founded by the Rurik dynasty in 987 centered in the region of Volhynia, straddling the borders of modern-day Ukraine, Belarus, and Poland. From 1069 to 1118, it belonged to Izyaslavichi who primarily ruled from Turov (see Principality of Turov). After losing Turov to Monomakhovichi in 1105, the descendants of Iziaslav Yaroslavovich for a few years continued to rule in Volhynia. From 1154 to 1199, the Principality was referred to as the Principality of Volodymyr when the Principality of Lutsk (1154–1228) was separated.

Territory 

The principality held the lands of the historic region of Volhynia from where it acquired its name. The capital of the principality as well as the largest and most important city of the region was Volodymyr. Other notable cities in the principality include Kremenets, Lutsk, Busk, Dorogobuzh, Brest, Belz, DuBetz and Shumsk.

History 

The Principality of Volhynia along with her sister state, the Principality of Halych were formed by sons of the ruling Rurik dynasty in Kiev. Following the fragmentation of Kievan Rus', the principality achieved autonomy in 1154.

Following the death of the prince of Halych Volodymyr Yaroslavovych in 1199, the Halych line of the Rurik dynasty had become extinct and the prince of Volhynia, Roman the Great annexed the principality, moved his seat to the city of Old Halych and formed the united Kingdom of Galicia-Volhynia.

Princes 
 987–1013 Vsevolod Volodymyrovych (brother of Yaroslav the Wise)

Rurikind / Yaroslavovychi
 ? – 1054 Sviatoslav II of Kiev (son of Yaroslav the Wise)
 1054–1057 Igor Yaroslavich (son of Yaroslav the Wise)

Rurikind / Volodymyrovychi
 1057–1064 Rostislav of Tmutarakan

Yaroslavovychi / Izyaslavovychi
 1069–1086 Yaropolk Izyaslavich (King of Rus since 1078)
 1073–1078 occupation by Olehovychi (Oleg I of Chernigov)
 1086–1100 occupation by Ihorevychi (Davyd Ihorevych)
 1099–1100 Mstislav Svyatopolchych
 1100–1118 Yaroslav Svyatopolchych

Monomakhovychi
 1118–1119 Roman Volodymyrovych
 1119–1135 Andrew the Good
 1135–1141 Iziaslav II of Kiev
 1141–1146 occupation by Olehovychi Sviatoslav III of Kiev
 1146–1149 Volodymyr of Dorohobuzh

Monomakhovychi / Mstislavovychi (senior line)
 1149–1151 Iziaslav II of Kiev
 1149–1154 Svyatopolk Mstislavych
 1154–1157 Vladimir III Mstislavich
 1157–1170 Mstislav II of Kiev
 1170–1205 Roman the Great
 1205–1208 occupation of Galicia-Volhynia by Olhovychi-Ihorevychi (Svyatoslav III Igorevich)
 1208–1215 Oleksandr of Belz
 1215–1238 Daniel of Galicia
 1238–1269 Vasylko Romanovych
 1269–1289 Volodymyr Vasylkovych
 1289– Mstyslav Danylovych
 –1301 Lev I of Galicia
 1301–1308 Yuri I of Galicia
 1308–1323 Andrew of Galicia

Piast vs Rurikind
 1323–1325 Volodymyr Lvovych
 1325–1340 Yuri II Boleslav
 1323–1349 Halych boyars led by Dmytro Dedko

Gedeminas
 1340–1392 War for succession of the Kingdom of Rus between Poland and Lithuania
 1340–1384 Demetrius of Liubar
 1366–1370 Oleksandr Korybut
 1384–1392 Fedir Liubartovych
 1430s–1452 Švitrigaila during the civil war in Lithuania

References

Subdivisions of Kievan Rus'
Former principalities